Michał Englert (born 4 May 1975) is a Polish cinematographer and screenwriter from Warsaw.

He graduated from the cinematography department of the National Film School in Łódź.

He is the son of Polish actress Marta Lipińska and actor and stage director . Actor Jan Englert is his uncle.

Awards
 2008: Gdynia Film Festival award for best cinematography for 33 Scenes from Life.
 2016: Polish Academy Award for Best Cinematography, for Body
 2016: Polish Academy Award for Best Screenplay, for Body

References

External links

1975 births
Living people
Polish cinematographers
Polish screenwriters
Film people from Warsaw